Bartered bride may refer to:

Bride-purchase, bride-selling, or bride trading
The Bartered Bride, an 1870 comic opera
The Bartered Bride (1932 film)
The Bartered Bride (1960 film)